The following active airports serve the area around Montreal, Quebec, Canada, lying underneath or immediately adjacent to Montreal's terminal control area:

Land based airports

Scheduled commercial airline service

Other

Montréal-Trudeau (formerly known as Dorval) handles the scheduled passenger service for Montreal. Mirabel formerly also handled scheduled passenger service, but it has been discontinued and the airport is little used. Saint-Hubert is the major general aviation reliever for the city, though Trudeau also sees a lot of general aviation traffic.

Plattsburgh International Airport in Plattsburgh, New York markets itself as "Montreal's U.S. airport". More than 80% of passengers departing the airport are Canadian.

Water aerodromes

Heliports

Historical airports

References

 
Airports
Montreal
Airports
Montreal